List of rivers in Pernambuco (Brazilian State).

The list is arranged by drainage basin from north to south, with respective tributaries indented under each larger stream's name and ordered from downstream to upstream. All rivers in Pernambuco drain to the Atlantic Ocean.

By Drainage Basin 

 Goiana River
 Pitanga River
 Siriji River
 Orobó River
 Tracunhaém River
 Zumbi River
 Paratibe River
 Beberibe River
 Capibaribe River
 Tapacurã River
 Goiatá River
 Tejipió River
 Jaboatão River
 Pirapama River
 Gurjaú River
 Ipojuca River
 Sirinhaém River
 Tapirucu River
 Una River
 Jacuípe River
 Preto River
 Palmares River
 Piranji River
 Persinunga River
 Mundaú River
 Inhumas River
 Paraíba River
 São Francisco River
 Traipu River
 Ipanema River
 Moxotó River
 Do Navio River
 Pajeú River
 Ouricuri River
 Terra Nova River
 Brigida River
 São Pedro River
 São João River
 Gravatá River 
 Garça River
 Pontal River

Alphabetically 

 Beberibe River
 Brigida River
 Capibaribe River
 Garça River
 Goiana River
 Goiatá River
 Gravatá River 
 Gurjaú River
 Inhumas River
 Ipanema River
 Ipojuca River
 Jaboatão River
 Jacuípe River
 Moxotó River
 Mundaú River
 Do Navio River
 Orobó River
 Ouricuri River
 Pajeú River
 Palmares River
 Paraíba River
 Paratibe River
 Persinuga River
 Piranji River
 Pirapama River
 Pitanga River
 Pontal River
 Preto River
 São Francisco River
 São João River
 São Pedro River
 Siriji River
 Sirinhaém River
 Tapacurã River
 Tapirucu River
 Terra Nova River
 Tijipió River
 Tracunhaém River
 Traipu River
 Una River
 Zumbi River

References
 Map from Ministry of Transport
  GEOnet Names Server

 
Pernambuco
Rivers
Environment of Pernambuco